also known as  , (1305–1340) was the brother of Nitta Yoshisada in the early fourteenth century, and supported the Southern Court of Emperor Go-Daigo in the Nanboku-chō period, capturing Kamakura with his brother from the Hōjō clan in 1333.  

Both Nitta brothers survived the Siege of Kanegasaki (1337) by fleeing to Somayama.

After his brother died, he fled to various parts of Japan including Mino, Owari, and Yoshino. 

In 1339, under orders from the new Emperor Go-Murakami, he captured Shiba Takatsune's fortress at Kuromaru.  He died while on campaign in Iyo.

References

Further reading
 McCullough, Helen Craig (1959). "The Taiheiki. A Chronicle of Medieval Japan." 1959. Charles E. Tuttle Company, Tokyo, .
 Papinot, E. (1910). "Historical and Geographical Dictionary of Japan. 1972 Printing. Charles E. Tuttle Company, Tokyo, .

Nitta clan
1305 births
1340 deaths
Samurai